The  was a professional golf tournament on the Japan Golf Tour in 2011 and 2012. It was played at the Grandee Hamanako Golf Club in Hamamatsu, Shizuoka Prefecture. In 2012, the purse was ￥100,000,000 with ￥20,000,000 going to the winner.

Winners

Notes

References

External links
Coverage on the Japan Golf Tour's official site

Former Japan Golf Tour events
Defunct golf tournaments in Japan
Sport in Shizuoka Prefecture
Recurring sporting events established in 2011
Recurring sporting events disestablished in 2012